Atlético de Madrid failed to live up to the high expectations, in spite of the appointment of multiple Copa Libertadores-winning coach Carlos Bianchi. The defensive triangle of goalkeeper Leo Franco and central defenders Luis Perea and Pablo Ibáñez, all of which played a huge part in Atlético conceding only 31 goals. The defensive tactics left high-profile striker Fernando Torres alone up front, and despite having Maxi Rodríguez in support, the duo were the only players able to function offensively for the club, which responded with a €23 million signing of 18-year-old superstarlet Sergio Agüero from Independiente.

Squad

Goalkeepers
  Leo Franco
  Iván Cuéllar
  Ismael Falcón
  Roberto

Defenders
  Juan Velasco Damas
  Antonio López
  García Calvo
  Francisco Molinero
  Valera
  Luis Perea
  Pablo Ibáñez
  Pablo Sicilia
  Antonio Moreno

Midfielders
  Gonzalo Colsa
  Zahínos
  Luciano Galletti
  Ariel Ibagaza
  Maxi Rodríguez
  Martin Petrov
  Gabi
  Peter Luccin
  Mario Suárez

Attackers
  Fernando Marqués
  Fernando Torres
  Mateja Kežman
  Arizmendi
  Braulio
  Manu del Moral
  Rufino

La Liga

Matches

Atlético Madrid–Real Zaragoza 0-0
Deportivo–Atlético Madrid 1-0
 1-0 Joan Capdevila 
Atlético Madrid–Barcelona 2-1
 0-1 Samuel Eto'o 
 1-1 Fernando Torres 
 2-1 Mateja Kežman 
Real Sociedad–Atlético Madrid 3-2
 0-1 Fernando Torres 
 0-2 Mateja Kežman 
 1-2 Darko Kovačević 
 2-2 Nihat 
 3-2 Darko Kovačević 
Atlético Madrid–Getafe 0-1
 0-1 Mariano Pernía 
Málaga–Atlético Madrid 0-2
 0-1 Fernando Torres 
 0-2 Mateja Kežman 
Atlético Madrid–Real Madrid 0-3
 0-1 Ronaldo 
 0-2 Ronaldo 
 0-3 Luis Perea 
Racing Santander–Atlético Madrid 0-1
 0-1 Maxi Rodríguez 
Atlético Madrid–Cádiz 3-0
 1-0 Maxi Rodríguez 
 2-0 Pablo Ibáñez 
 3-0 Luciano Galletti 
Atlético Madrid–Villarreal 1-1
 1-0 Zahínos 
 1-1 Diego Forlán 
Sevilla–Atlético Madrid 0-0
Celta Vigo–Atlético Madrid 2-1
 1-0 Fernando Baiano 
 2-0 Fabián Canobbio 
 2-1 Antonio López 
Atlético Madrid–Espanyol 1-1
 1-0 Peter Luccin 
 1-1 Dani Jarque 
Athletic Bilbao–Atlético Madrid 1-1
 0-1 Mateja Kežman 
 1-1 Pablo Orbaiz 
Atlético Madrid–Alavés 1-1
 1-0 Fernando Torres 
 1-1 Josu Sarriegi 
Mallorca–Atlético Madrid 2-2
 0-1 Maxi Rodríguez 
 0-2 Gonzalo Colsa 
 1-2 Mark Iuliano 
 2-2 Mark Iuliano 
Osasuna–Atlético Madrid 2-1
 0-1 Martin Petrov 
 1-1 Raúl García 
 2-1 Bernardo Romeo 
Atlético Madrid–Valencia 0-0
Betis–Atlético Madrid 1-0
 1-0 Capi 
Real Zaragoza–Atlético Madrid 0-2
 0-1 Maxi Rodríguez 
 0-2 Fernando Torres 
Atlético Madrid–Deportivo 3-2
 1-0 Maxi Rodríguez 
 1-1 Rubén 
 2-1 Antonio López 
 2-2 Joan Capdevila 
 3-2 Maxi Rodríguez 
Barcelona–Atlético Madrid 1-3
 0-1 Fernando Torres 
 0-2 Maxi Rodríguez 
 1-2 Henrik Larsson 
 1-3 Fernando Torres 
Atlético Madrid–Real Sociedad 1-0
 1-0 Mateja Kežman 
Getafe–Atlético Madrid 0-3
 0-1 Peter Luccin 
 0-2 Maxi Rodríguez 
 0-3 Fernando Torres 
Atlético Madrid–Málaga 5-0
 1-0 Fernando Torres 
 2-0 Fernando Torres 
 3-0 Maxi Rodríguez 
 4-0 Valera 
 5-0 Valera 
Real Madrid–Atlético Madrid 2-1
 1-0 Antonio Cassano 
 1-1 Mateja Kežman 
 2-1 Júlio Baptista 
Atlético Madrid–Racing Santander 2-1
 1-0 Fernando Torres 
 1-1 Damià 
Villarreal–Atlético Madrid 1-1
 1-0 Diego Forlán 
 1-1 Fernando Torres 
Atlético Madrid–Sevilla 0-1
 0-1 Antonio Puerta 
Cádiz–Atlético Madrid 1-1
 0-1 Mateja Kežman 
 1-1 Lucas Lobos 
Atlético Madrid–Celta Vigo 0-3
 0-1 Matías Lequi 
 0-2 Fernando Baiano 
 0-3 Daniël de Ridder 
Espanyol–Atlético Madrid 1-1
 0-1 Gabi 
 1-1 Walter Pandiani 
Atlético Madrid–Athletic Bilbao 1-0
 1-0 Fernando Torres 
Alavés–Atlético Madrid 0-1
 0-1 Antonio López 
Atlético Madrid–Mallorca 0-1
 0-1 Jonás Gutiérrez 
Atlético Madrid–Osasuna 0-1
 0-1 Iñaki Muñoz 
Valencia–Atlético Madrid 1-1
 1-0 David Villa 
 1-1 Maxi Rodríguez 
Atlético Madrid–Betis 1-1
 1-0 Mateja Kežman 
 1-1 Arzu

Topscorers
  Fernando Torres 13
  Maxi Rodríguez 10
  Mateja Kežman 8

Atlético Madrid seasons
Atletico Madrid